The Summerfield District is a  historic district in Summerfield, Dallas County, Alabama.  It is bounded by the Selma-Summerfield and Marion roads, and Centenary and College streets. Federal and Greek Revival are the primary architectural styles in the district.  It contains 10 contributing properties and 6 noncontributing properties.  The contributing properties are the Summerfield Methodist Church (1845), Summerfield Bank Building (mid 19th century), school (mid 19th century), Moore-Pinson-Tate-Hudson House (1840s), Sturdivant-Moore-Caine-Hodo House (c. 1830), Johnson-Chisolm-Reed House (mid 19th century), unnamed residence (late 19th century), Bishop Andrew-Brady House (c. 1840), Swift-Moore-Cottingham House (c. 1850), and Childers-Tate-Crow House (prior to 1827).  The Summerfield District was added to the National Register of Historic Places on March 1, 1982.

References

External links
 
 
 
 

National Register of Historic Places in Dallas County, Alabama
Historic districts in Dallas County, Alabama
Historic American Buildings Survey in Alabama
Historic districts on the National Register of Historic Places in Alabama